The following outline is provided as an overview of, and introduction to Argentina:

Argentina – country in South America, the continent's second largest by land area, after Brazil. It is constituted as a federation of 23 provinces and an autonomous city, Buenos Aires. It is the eighth-largest country in the world by land area and the largest among Spanish-speaking nations.

General reference 

 Pronunciation: 
 Common English country name: Argentina
 Official English country name: The Argentine Republic
 Common endonym(s): Argentina
 Official endonym(s): República Argentina
 Adjectival(s): Argentine 
 Demonym(s):
 Etymology: Name of Argentina
 International rankings of Argentina
 ISO country codes: AR, ARG, 032
 ISO region codes: See ISO 3166-2:AR
 Internet country code top-level domain: .ar

Geography of Argentina 

Geography of Argentina
 Argentina is a: Country
 Location:
 Southern Hemisphere
 Western Hemisphere
 Latin America
 South America
 Southern Cone
 Time zone:
 Argentina Time - (UTC-03) - No DST
 Extreme points of Argentina
 High:  Aconcagua  – highest point outside of Asia
 Low:  Laguna del Carbón  – lowest point in the Western Hemisphere and the Southern Hemisphere
 Land boundaries:  9,861 km
 5,308 km
 1,880 km
 1,261 km
 832 km
 580 km
 Coastline:  4,989 km
 Population of Argentina: 40,677,348 people (2008 estimate) - 30th most populous country
 Area of Argentina:   - 8th largest country
 Atlas of Argentina

Environment of Argentina 

Environment of Argentina
 Climate of Argentina
 Renewable energy in Argentina
 Geology of Argentina
 Earthquakes in Argentina
 Protected areas of Argentina
 Biosphere reserves in Argentina
 National parks of Argentina
 Wildlife of Argentina
 Flora of Argentina
 Fauna of Argentina
 Birds of Argentina
 Mammals of Argentina

Natural geographic features of Argentina 
 Glaciers of Argentina
 Islands of Argentina
 Lakes of Argentina
 Mountains of Argentina
 Volcanoes in Argentina
 Rivers of Argentina
 World Heritage Sites in Argentina

Regions of Argentina 

Regions of Argentina
The provinces of Argentina are often grouped into six geographical regions. From North to South and West to East, these are:
Argentine Northwest: Jujuy, Salta, Tucumán, Catamarca, La Rioja
Gran Chaco: Formosa, Chaco, Santiago del Estero
Mesopotamia (or Littoral): Misiones, Entre Ríos, Corrientes
Cuyo: San Juan, Mendoza, San Luis
Pampas: Córdoba, Santa Fe, La Pampa, Buenos Aires
Patagonia: Rio Negro, Neuquén, Chubut, Santa Cruz, Tierra del Fuego
 Argentine Antarctica

Administrative divisions of Argentina

Provinces

Provinces of Argentina

Municipalities of Argentina 

Municipalities of Argentina
 Cities of Argentina
 Capital of Argentina: Buenos Aires

Demography of Argentina

Government and politics of Argentina 

Politics of Argentina
 Form of government: federal presidential representative democratic republic
 Capital of Argentina: Buenos Aires
 Elections in Argentina
 Primary elections in Argentina
 Political parties in Argentina
 Taxation in Argentina

Branches of the government of Argentina 

Government of Argentina

Executive branch of the government of Argentina 

 Head of state and government: President of Argentina, Alberto Fernández
 Cabinet of Argentina
 Chief of the Cabinet of Ministers
 Minister of the Interior
 Minister of Foreign Relations (mostly known as the Chancellor)
 Minister of Defense
 Minister of Economy
 Minister of Justice and Human Rights
 Minister of Security
 Minister of Labor, Employment and Social Security
 Minister of Education
 Minister of Science, Technology and Product Innovation
 Minister of Health
 Minister of Social Development
 Minister of Federal Planning, Public Infrastructure and Services
 Minister of Industry
 Minister of Agriculture
 Minister of Tourism

Legislative branch of the government of Argentina 

 Argentine National Congress (Congreso Nacional) (bicameral)
 Upper house: Argentine Senate (72 seats), presided by the Vice-President
 Argentine Chamber of Deputies (257 seats), currently presided by Emilio Monzó of Buenos Aires Province).

Judicial branch of the government of Argentina 

Court system of Argentina

 Supreme Court of Argentina
 President of the Supreme Court: Dr. Ricardo L. Lorenzetti
 Vice-President of the Supreme Court: Dra. Elena I. Highton de Nolasco
 Minister of the Court: Dr. Carlos Fernando Rosenkrantz
 Minister of the Court: Dr. Juan Carlos Maqueda
 Minister of the Court: Dr. Horacio Rosatti

Foreign relations of Argentina 

Foreign relations of Argentina
 Diplomatic missions
 Diplomatic missions in Argentina
 Diplomatic missions of Argentina

International organization membership 
The Argentine Republic is a member of:

African Development Bank Group (AfDB) (nonregional member)
Agency for the Prohibition of Nuclear Weapons in Latin America and the Caribbean (OPANAL)
Andean Community of Nations (CAN) (associate)
Australia Group
Bank for International Settlements (BIS)
Central American Bank for Economic Integration (BCIE)
Central American Integration System (SICA) (observer)
Food and Agriculture Organization (FAO)
Group of 15 (G15)
Group of Twenty Finance Ministers and Central Bank Governors (G20)
Group of 24 (G24)
Group of 77 (G77)
International Astronautical Federation (IAF)
Inter-American Development Bank (IADB)
International Atomic Energy Agency (IAEA)
International Bank for Reconstruction and Development (IBRD)
International Chamber of Commerce (ICC)
International Civil Aviation Organization (ICAO)
International Criminal Court (ICCt)
International Criminal Police Organization (Interpol)
International Development Association (IDA)
International Federation of Red Cross and Red Crescent Societies (IFRCS)
International Finance Corporation (IFC)
International Fund for Agricultural Development (IFAD)
International Hydrographic Organization (IHO)
International Labour Organization (ILO)
International Maritime Organization (IMO)
International Mobile Satellite Organization (IMSO)
International Monetary Fund (IMF)
International Bamboo and Rattan Organisation (INBAR)
International Olympic Committee (IOC)
International Organization for Migration (IOM)
International Organization for Standardization (ISO)
International Red Cross and Red Crescent Movement (ICRM)
International Telecommunication Union (ITU)

International Telecommunications Satellite Organization (ITSO)
International Trade Union Confederation (ITUC)
Inter-Parliamentary Union (IPU)
Latin American Economic System (LAES)
Latin American Integration Association (LAIA)
Multilateral Investment Guarantee Agency (MIGA)
Nuclear Suppliers Group (NSG)
Organisation for the Prohibition of Chemical Weapons (OPCW)
Organization of American States (OAS)
Permanent Court of Arbitration (PCA)
Rio Group (RG)
Southern Cone Common Market (Mercosur)
International Institute for the Unification of Private Law (UNIDROIT)
Unión Latina (observer)
United Nations (UN)
Union of South American Nations (UNASUR)
United Nations Conference on Trade and Development (UNCTAD)
United Nations Educational, Scientific, and Cultural Organization (UNESCO)
United Nations High Commissioner for Refugees (UNHCR)
United Nations Industrial Development Organization (UNIDO)
United Nations Mission for the Referendum in Western Sahara (MINURSO)
United Nations Peacekeeping Force in Cyprus (UNFICYP)
United Nations Stabilization Mission in Haiti (MINUSTAH)
United Nations Truce Supervision Organization (UNTSO)
Universal Postal Union (UPU)
World Confederation of Labour (WCL)
World Customs Organization (WCO)
World Federation of Trade Unions (WFTU)
World Health Organization (WHO)
World Intellectual Property Organization (WIPO)
World Meteorological Organization (WMO)
World Tourism Organization (UNWTO)
World Trade Organization (WTO)
Zangger Committee (ZC)

Law and order in Argentina 

Law of Argentina
 Constitution of Argentina
 Crime in Argentina
 Human rights in Argentina
 LGBT rights in Argentina
 Law enforcement in Argentina
 National law enforcement agencies
Argentine Federal Police
Argentine National Gendarmerie
Argentine Naval Prefecture
Airport Security Police
Federal Penitentiary Service
 Regional law enforcement agencies
Buenos Aires Provincial Police
Santa Fe Province Police
Córdoba Province Police
Tucumán Province Police

Military of Argentina 

Armed Forces of the Argentine Republic
 Command
 Commander-in-chief: President of Argentina, Alberto Fernández
 Ministry of Defense (Argentina)
 Forces
 Argentine Army
 Argentine Army Aviation
 Argentine Air Force
 Agrupación Aérea Presidencial
 Argentine Air Force Mobile Field Hospital
 Argentine Navy
 Argentine Naval Aviation
 Argentine Marines
 Military history of Argentina
 Military ranks of Argentina
 White Helmets Commission

History of Argentina 

History of Argentina

History of Argentina, by period 
 May Revolution

History of Argentina, by region 

 History of Buenos Aires
 Timeline of Buenos Aires history

History of Argentina, by subject 
 Economic history of Argentina
 Military history of Argentina
 LGBT history in Argentina

Culture of Argentina 

Culture of Argentina
 Architecture of Argentina
 Cuisine of Argentina
 Humor in Argentina
 Languages of Argentina
 Media in Argentina
 National symbols of Argentina
 Coat of arms of Argentina
 Flag of Argentina
 National anthem of Argentina
 People of Argentina
 Public holidays in Argentina
 Religion in Argentina
 Buddhism in Argentina
 Christianity in Argentina
 Hinduism in Argentina
 Islam in Argentina
 Judaism in Argentina
 World Heritage Sites in Argentina

Art in Argentina 
 Cinema of Argentina
 Literature of Argentina
 Music of Argentina
 List of music artists and bands from Argentina
 Television in Argentina
 Theatre in Argentina

Sports in Argentina 

Sports in Argentina
 Argentina at the Olympics
 Football in Argentina

Economy and infrastructure of Argentina 

Economy of Argentina
 Economic rank, by nominal GDP (2007):  31st (thirty-first)
 Agriculture in Argentina
 Banking in Argentina
 Communications in Argentina
 Internet in Argentina
.ar Internet country code top-level domain for Argentina
 Companies of Argentina
 Currency of Argentina: Peso
ISO 4217: ARS
 Economic history of Argentina
 Energy in Argentina
 Energy in Argentina
 Health care in Argentina
 Mining in Argentina
 Argentina Stock Exchange
 Tourism in Argentina
 Visa policy of Argentina
 Transport in Argentina
 Airports in Argentina
 Rail transport in Argentina
 Roads in Argentina
 Water supply and sanitation in Argentina

Education in Argentina 

Education in Argentina
 List of schools in Argentina
 Roman Catholic seminaries in Argentina
 Universities in Argentina
 Agricultural universities and colleges in Argentina

See also

Index of Argentina-related articles
List of Argentina-related topics
List of international rankings
Member state of the Group of Twenty Finance Ministers and Central Bank Governors
Member state of the United Nations
Outline of geography
Outline of South America

References

External links

 
 Government of Argentina 
 Official website
 Information about Buenos Aires
 The President of Argentina
 

 Country Data
 Argentina. The World Factbook. Central Intelligence Agency.
World Bank's country data profile for Argentina.
 World Intellectual Property Handbook: Argentina

Argentina

 
Wikipedia outlines